The National Air Force Museum of Canada is an aviation museum dedicated to preserving the history of the Royal Canadian Air Force (RCAF) and is located on the west side of CFB Trenton in Trenton, Ontario.

The museum is a permanent archive which collects, preserves and displays Royal Canadian Air Force (RCAF) memorabilia, photographs, paintings and documents as a lasting tribute and memorial to all the men and women who served in the RCAF and its predecessor organizations.

History 
The RCAF Memorial Library and Museum opened on 1 April 1984 – the 60th anniversary of the establishment of the Royal Canadian Air Force – in the CFB Trenton Recreation Center. However, the museum quickly outgrew the location and moved to the base's former curling club exactly 10 years later in 1994. With the acquisition of a Handley Page Halifax restoration project in 1995, the museum was again short on space. So from 2004 to 2005 the museum constructed a purpose built Main Exhibition Hall. This was not before the name of the museum was changed to the Air Force National Museum in 1998. Ten years later, it was changed again to the National Air Force Museum of Canada.

Between November 2012 and August 2013, a second phase of construction was completed on the main exhibition hall. This involved adding additional staircases between the two floors of the building and finishing various rooms.

In 2016, the museum acquired an Avro Lancaster that had been on display in Edmundston, New Brunswick. Chris Colton, the executive director of the museum for 21 years, retired in June 2018. Later that year, the museum acquired a CP-140 Aurora.

Collection

Aircraft on display 

 AEA Silver Dart – replica
 Auster AOP.6
 Avro Anson
 Avro Canada CF-100 Canuck 18774
 Beechcraft CT-134 Musketeer 134201
 Bell CH-118 Iroquois 118101
 Bell CH-135 Twin Huey 135102
 Bell CH-136 Kiowa 136204
 Boeing CH-47D Chinook 147201
 Boeing Vertol CH-113 Labrador 11315
 Boeing 720 18024
 Bombardier CC-144 Challenger 144601
 Burgess-Dunne – replica
 Canadair CF-5 Freedom Fighter 11672
 Canadair CF-104 Starfighter 104646
 Canadair CP-107 Argus 10732
 Canadair CT-114 Tutor 114015
 Canadair CT-133 Silver Star 21435
 Canadair CT-133 Silver Star 133593 – cutaway
 Canadair Sabre V 23257
 de Havilland Canada Chipmunk T.10 WB550
 de Havilland Canada CP-121 Tracker 1545
 Douglas CC-129 Dakota 12963
 Handley Page Halifax A.VII NA337
 Hawker Hunter F.58 J-4029
 Hawker Hurricane II V7287 – replica
 Lockheed CC-130E Hercules 130313
 McDonnell CF-101 Voodoo 101040
 McDonnell Douglas CF-18 Hornet 188911
 Mikoyan-Gurevich MiG-21MF 23+45
 North American Harvard II 3270
 North American Yale 3411
 SAGEM Sperwer 161007
 Sikorsky Dragonfly 9601
 Supermarine Spitfire IX ML380 – replica

Under restoration 

 Avro Lancaster B.X KB882
 Lockheed Hudson VI FK466

Memorials 
There are 29 memorials and cairns dedicated to RCAF squadrons and units:

 No. 6 Group RCAF
 No. 6 Repair Depot
 306 Maple Leaf Wing RCAFA
 405 Squadron
 407 Demon Squadron
 408 Squadron
 413 Squadron
 424 Squadron
 426 Squadron
 429 Squadron
 431 Squadron
 434 Squadron
 435 Squadron
 436 Squadron
 437 Squadron
 438 Squadron
 AWFP Association
 Burma Bomber Association
 Canadian Military Flight Engineers Association
 Dodo Birds – ex RCAF Flight Sergeants
 Jewish Memorial
 Loadmaster Memorial
 Mobile Support Equipment
 Non-Destructive Testing
 Para Rescue Association of Canada
 RCAF and Allied Forces Bomber Command
 RCAF Fighter Pilots Association
 RCAF Meteorologists
 RCAF Police
 Sabre Pilots I Air Division
 Workshop Machinists

Affiliations 
The museum is affiliated with: CMA,  CHIN, OMMC and Virtual Museum of Canada.

See also 

List of aviation museums
National Museum of the United States Air Force
Organization of Military Museums of Canada

References

External links 

 
 History of the Canadian Forces Museums 1919–2004
 Photos of the museum collection
 Photos of the museum collection

History of Canadian military aviation
Royal Canadian Air Force
Military and war museums in Canada
Military history of Canada
Aerospace museums in Ontario
Air force museums
Museums in Hastings County